Walter Gröbli (1852–1903) was a Swiss mathematician.

Life and work 
His father, Issak Gröbli, was an industrial who was invented a shuttle embroidery machine in 1863, and his old brother is credited to have introduced the invention in the United States. Walter Gröbli was more interested in mathematics than in embroidery and he studied from 1871 to 1875 at the Polytechnicum of Zurich under Hermann Schwarz and Heinrich Martin Weber. Then Gröbli studied at university of Berlin and he was awarded a doctorate in the university of Göttingen (1877).

The following six years, Gröbli was assistant of Frobenius in Polytechnicum of Zurich. In 1883 he was elected mathematics professor in the Gymnasium of Zurich. Despite his mathematical talent he did not follow a research career, he was happy to be a schoolmaster.

His other main passion was mountaineering. He died with other three colleagues on a mountain accident climbing the Piz Blas.

The only work known by Gröbli was his doctoral thesis dissertation. It deals about three vortex motion, four vortex motion having an axis of symmetry and  vortex motion having  symmetry axes. This work is a classical in vortex dynamics literature.

References

Bibliography

External links 
 
 

19th-century Swiss mathematicians
1852 births
1903 deaths